Hans Gildemeister and Andrés Gómez were the defending champions, but none competed this year.

Stefan Simonsson and Magnus Tideman won the title by defeating Francisco Yunis and Juan Carlos Yunis 6–4, 6–2 in the final.

Seeds

Draw

Draw

References

External links
 Official results archive (ATP)
 Official results archive (ITF)

1983 Grand Prix (tennis)
ATP Bordeaux